Wayang-Windu is a twin volcano that consists of Mount Wayang (Indonesian: Gunung Wayang, "Mount Shadow") and Mount Windu. The area has been an active geothermal project.

See also 
 List of volcanoes in Indonesia

References 

Bandung Regency
Mountains of Indonesia
Volcanoes of West Java
Pleistocene lava domes